This is a list of some experimental laboratory atomic clocks worldwide.

References

Atomic clocks